The Creative Gene: How books, movies, and music inspired the creator of Death Stranding and Metal Gear Solid is an autobiographical book written by Japanese video game designer Hideo Kojima, published on October 12, 2021 by Viz Media. Based on the collection of essays titled The Gifted Gene and My Lovable Memes Kojima published in Japan in 2019, the book focuses on Kojima's inspirations on his work from various pop culture media, such as books, movies and music. Exploring themes such as isolationism, loneliness, grief and death, The Creative Gene collocates personal anecdotes of Kojima's life involving his inspirations with his sentiments towards the multitude of works that inspired him. The Creative Gene received positive reviews from critics, with praise given towards Kojima's exploration of his inspirations and their influence on his life.

Premise and content 
The Creative Gene is an autobiographical book comprising a variety of short stories, essays and anecdotes encompassing Kojima's life, many of which focus on the various pop culture media Kojima developed an adoration for and how they have impacted him. One of the first essays in the book recounts Kojima's affinity for literature originating from his childhood; proclaiming himself as a "latchkey kid," Kojima routinely read books as a child as a way to deal with his father's death, gaining life experience from the lessons he learned from books along with movies. Kojima further elaborates his beliefs on storytelling, stating that "stories allow you to experience places you could never go – the past, the future, or distant worlds. You can become a different ethnicity or gender. Even when you're reading all by yourself, you're sharing those stories as they unfold before you with countless people whom you've never met." Kojima also discusses his routine for visiting bookstores during his free time, conveying that exploring the various works of literature helps him "become better at finding encounters that are meaningful to me, and I further hone my sensibilities."

One notable essay in the book deals with Kojima's adoration of outer space stemming from his childhood. Originally published in 2009, the essay delves into the impact that space has had on Kojima's outlook on humanity, while also revealing his dream to venture into space someday. In the essay, Kojima expressed that he would be complacent with orbiting across Earth's atmosphere, along with confessing that he would sacrifice his position as a game developer to pursue his dream. Kojima also avowed that he desired to become an astronaut, but was unable to do so as a result of the limits of Japan's developing space program during his childhood. Another essay in the book combines Kojima's review of the 2008 light novel Hankyu Densha from Japanese author Hiro Arikawa with his childhood recollections of the Hankyu Railway. Titled "For Me, The Hankyu Railway Is A Time Machine Connecting Memories To My Hometown," the chapter sees Kojima recalling memories of riding trains on the railway in various moments of his life, including his adulthood where he rode the train again one year before writing the essay. Kojima reflected on the sentimental value of Hankyu Railway, writing that the railway was "not just a means of getting from one place to another, but a time machine connecting my memories to my hometown."

Background and development 

Hideo Kojima is a Japanese video game designer most notable for creating the video game series Metal Gear, Policenauts, Snatcher and the 2019 video game Death Stranding. Appraised as an "auteur" and a prominent figure in the video game industry, Kojima wrote the book The Gifted Gene and My Lovable Memes as a collection of essays detailing his inspirations. The book was originally published in Japanese and released in Japan in 2019.  In February 2021, Viz Media announced that a translated version of the book will be released later that year, under the title of The Creative Gene: How books, movies, and music inspired the creator of Death Stranding and Metal Gear Solid; The Creative Gene was released on October 12, 2021.

Themes and style 
Various publications noted that the book chronicles the connections between Kojima's favorite works of media and the events surrounding his life. Through its interwoven reflections of Kojima's life and his sentiments towards various media, The Creative Gene explores how media consumption frames humanity's perception of the world. Writing for The A.V. Club, Sam Barsanti considered the media discussed in Kojima's essays as tangential subjects that ultimately reflected larger ideas prevalent in Kojima's life. Barsanti asserted that Kojima's essay on the Japanese anime series Space Battleship Yamato delved into Kojima's relationship with his father. He also noted a similar pattern with Kojima's essay on TV shows Bewitched, Little House on the Prairie, and anime Shin Chan exploring how the death of Kojima's father influenced Kojima's values on family. Cameron Kunzelman of Paste magazine stated that the book shows Kojima "constantly reflecting his own experiences with media through what was happening in both his personal life and the broader context of Japanese culture," elaborating that Kojima's inspirations in his work demonstrate the "philosophy of creation, in which the individual person is always a kind of cultural nexus who mixes influences and produces new things." Publications also noted that Kojima eschews overt explanations of his specific creative process and mere summaries of his inspirations in The Creative Gene. Joshua Furr of DualShockers wrote that the book contained few references to the video games Kojima created such as the Metal Gear saga, instead discussing books, films and music that related to his life.

Kunzelman claimed that the book also discusses topics such as loneliness, isolation, death and grief. He went on to state that the book contains a "tragic focus" prevailing through many of the stories, arguing that Kojima's propensity to focus on darker works of media "center on his interest in the relationship between people, their societies, and how they deal with massive environmental changes." Annette Polis of Siliconera notes that the book divulges aspects of Kojima's personal life such as coping with his father's death and his conflicts with depression, while Furr noted an essay Kojima wrote about the film Taxi Driver as connecting to Kojima's loneliness in his childhood. An essay about the novelization of Metal Gear Solid 4: Guns of the Patriots was also pointed out by several publications as reflecting themes of death and grief in the book; Satoshi Itoh, a close friend of Kojima and the author of the novel, succumbed to cancer in 2009 at the age of 34, shortly after the novel was completed. In an article analyzing the relevance of Kojima's 2019 video game Death Stranding, Rich Stanton of PC Gamer related the book's themes of loneliness and isolationism to the game.

Aspects of the book also elaborate on themes explored in Kojima's games, such as genes, memes and scenes; all three ideas were explored in the Metal Gear Solid games. Barsanti noted that The Creative Gene extensively focuses on the idea of memes, with Kojima's discussions on the media he enjoys conveying how information influences the upbringing of individuals. Kunzelman referred to Kojima's emphasis on memes as "Dawkinsian," while also describing Kojima's views on memes as coming from a more individualized standpoint that involves the spread of ideas amongst people. Writing for GamesHub, indie game developer Naphtali Faulkner analyzed Kojima's relationships with media in the context of creation, namely how ideas that develop beyond various generations inspire works of art. Faulkner states that through the exploration of media, the book "shows how we can start to think about memes as more than just homage – how we can start to cut away the surface of the things we like, and dig down into the spirit of the ideas that resonate with us."

Reception 
The Creative Gene received positive reviews from various media outlets, many of whom praised the personal and heartfelt nature of the book. The A.V. Club rated the book an A-, with Barsanti praising Kojima's passionate expressions for his favorite works of art; he opined that the best moments of the book "are glimpses into the mind of a visionary artist who just happens to work in a medium that isn't always known for its capacity for visionary art." Kunzelman gave praise to the book as well, feeling that the book not only offered insight into Kojima's influences, but also the recurring dark motifs found in Kojima's life and works. Comparing the book to Kojima's affinity for science fiction tragedies, Kunzelman regarded the book as akin to a premonition that offers "a glimpse into a particular kind of human machine," also asserting that "embracing it wholly would put us down the wrong path." Stanton offered both praise and minor criticism for the book as well, noting that the book "veers between searing insight and tiresome navel-gazing. You're absorbed on some pages, and your eye's flicking to the next paragraph on others."

Several critics noted that The Creative Gene gave them a more profound admiration for the various works of fiction that they enjoy as well. Polis found that aspects of her life related to the multitude of media that Kojima enjoyed, observing that they shared a common interest in authors such as Agatha Christie, Miyuki Miyabe, and Kazuo Umezz. Polis then propounded that the book was a "fantastic look into the mind of one of gaming's best known designers." Joshua Furr of DualShockers expressed that he hadn't "found a greater display of affection for books, music, and film than in Kojima's book." Barsanti pointed out that while readers may not necessarily share the same adoration for Kojima's favorite works of art as him, he asserted that the book "might give you a deeper appreciation for the things that you do." Technology website Engadget ranked The Creative Gene as one of their favorite books of 2022, with writer Josh Dunn claiming that the book "is an appreciation of how art of all stripes can spark inspiration in a recyclable process."

References 

Hideo Kojima
2021 books
2021 non-fiction books
2021 short story collections
Japanese books
Japanese short story collections
Japanese autobiographies
Japanese non-fiction literature
Japanese non-fiction books